Minor may refer to:

 Minor (law), a person under the age of certain legal activities.
 A person who has not reached the age of majority
 Academic minor, a secondary field of study in undergraduate education

Music theory
Minor chord
 Barbershop seventh chord or minor seventh chord
Minor interval
Minor key
Minor scale

Mathematics
 Minor (graph theory), the relation of one graph to another given certain conditions
 Minor (linear algebra), the determinant of a certain submatrix

People
 Charles Minor (1835–1903), American college administrator
 Charles A. Minor (born 1942), Liberian diplomat
 Dan Minor (1909–1982), American jazz trombonist
 Dave Minor (1922–1998), American basketball player
 James T. Minor, US academic administrator and sociologist
 Jerry Minor (born 1969), American actor, comedian and writer
 Kyle Minor (born 1976), American writer
 Mike Minor (actor) (born 1940), American actor
 Mike Minor (baseball) (born 1987), American baseball pitcher
 Solomon Zalkind Minor (1826/7–1900), Lithuanian-Russian rabbi and writer
 William Chester Minor (1834–1920), American contributor to the Oxford English Dictionary

Places
 Minor, Alabama, United States
 Asia Minor, the westernmost region of Asia
 Minor Creek (California)
 Minor Creek (Missouri)

Sports
 Minor league, a sports league not regarded as a premier league
 Minor League Baseball or "the minors", the North American professional baseball leagues affiliated to but below Major League Baseball
 Minor penalty in ice hockey

Vehicles
 Morris Minor, a British automobile brand
 Jawa Minor, a Czech automobile introduced 1937
 Aero Minor, a Czech automobile from Jawa Motors, 1946–1952

Other uses
 Minor, a chocolate brand owned by Maestrani
 Minor suit or minors in contract bridge, namely clubs and diamonds
 Minor Theater in Arcata, California, United States
 Minor v. Happersett, a case appealed to the US Supreme Court concerning the right to vote

Plays
The Minor (Foote play), 1760
The Minor (Fonvizin play), 1782

See also
 
 
 Major (disambiguation)
 Menorca, Spain (historically called "Minorca")
 Minority (disambiguation)

Distinguish from
 Miner